Tour de Force: Live in London is a series of videos and live albums by American blues-rock musician Joe Bonamassa. Produced by Kevin Shirley and directed by Philippe Klose, the albums document the guitarist and vocalist's four performances at four venues in London, England in March 2013. Each of the four shows were initially released as videos on October 28, 2013 in Europe by Provogue Records, and the following day in North America by J&R Adventures, with a box set featuring all four shows and a special collector's edition hardback book also issued at the same time. All four shows were issued as live albums on May 19, 2014.

During March 2013, Bonamassa performed a series of shows at four venues in London, each of which featured different personnel and themes. On March 26, a three-piece lineup performed a set featuring many of Bonamassa's early songs at The Borderline; on March 27, a larger band including a keyboardist and horn section performed a blues-themed set at Shepherd's Bush Empire; on March 28, another lineup of the group including a percussionist and backing vocalist focused on the rock genre at the Hammersmith Apollo; and on March 30, Bonamassa performed acoustic and electric "greatest hits" sets with two different bands at the Royal Albert Hall.

All four Tour de Force single-show video releases reached the top ten of the US Billboard Music Video Sales chart and the UK Music Video Chart, with the complete collection reaching number 18 in the US. The four live albums all reached the top ten of the Billboard Blues Albums chart and the UK Jazz & Blues Albums Chart, while the Royal Albert Hall release also charted on the Billboard Independent Albums chart (at number 46) and the UK Albums Chart (at number 131). Media response to the albums was generally positive, with commentators praising the ambition of the releases, as well as the variety of set lists and performances across the shows.

Background and release
Billed as "The Guitar Event of the Year", Joe Bonamassa performed four shows in London, England in March 2013 – at The Borderline on March 26, at Shepherd's Bush Empire on March 27, at Hammersmith Apollo on March 28, and at the Royal Albert Hall on March 30. The official press release for the shows explained that they were designed to "chronicle Bonamassa's atmospheric rise from the intimate club environment of The Borderline, to the prestigious Royal Albert Hall", with each date featuring a different band lineup and set list theme to match the according phase of his career – the first would feature a three-piece band performing a "jammy tribute to Bonamassa's earlier career"; the second would be a "blues-themed night" including a horn section designed to create a "soulful, big-blues-band feel"; the third would be a "rock-inspired evening" beginning with a short acoustic set; and the fourth would be a "half acoustic/half electric show" based on Bonamassa's "most popular and well-known songs".

The idea for the four different shows in London was originally conceived by Bonamassa's producer Kevin Shirley and manager Roy Weisman, the latter of whom recalled that he had suggested Bonamassa use the four shows as "an opportunity for him to go back on his entire career and do a lot of songs he'd recorded but never played live",. Bonamassa added that "London is like my second home. With these shows, I wanted to give the fans attending the London 2013 shows a real treat – something special to thank them for their unwavering support." The initial release of Tour de Force: Live in London on October 28, 2013 included four double DVD and Blu-ray sets (one for each show), as well as a collector's edition box set containing all four videos and a hardback book packaged in a box designed to look like a Marshall amplifier.

Reception

Commercial
All four single-show Tour de Force: Live in London videos debuted in the top ten of the US Billboard Music Video Sales chart, with the Royal Albert Hall release entering at the highest position, number 5. They also reached the top ten of the UK Music Video Chart, with Royal Albert Hall reaching number 4. Elsewhere in Europe, the albums reached the top ten in Belgium, the Netherlands, and Sweden. The Tour de Force: Live in London box set containing all four shows charted at number 18 in the US, number 2 in Austria, number 3 in Switzerland, and number 14 in Germany.

The following year, all four Tour de Force: Live in London albums entered the top ten of the US Billboard Blues Albums chart, with the Royal Albert Hall release reaching number 4. They also all reached the top ten of the UK Jazz & Blues Albums Chart, with the Royal Albert Hall album peaking at number 3. Royal Albert Hall also reached number 131 on the UK Albums Chart. Three of the four releases also charted in Belgium, two of the four charted in the Netherlands, The Borderline album charted in France, and the Royal Albert Hall album also charted in Austria and Switzerland.

Critical

Media response to Tour de Force: Live in London was positive. Classic Rock and its sister publication Blues each presented Tour de Force: Live in London with ratings of eight out of ten, with Hugh Fielder for the former praising the breadth of material available on the set. For Blues, Henry Yates proposed that "we can't remember the last time a live blues event caught the imagination quite like Joe Bonamassa's four-night stand", praising elements of the videos' production (including "stellar camerawork and pin-sharp sound"), the extra content included on the releases (which he described as "a healthy dollop of bonus material"), and the performances themselves (he concludes his review by saying that "Tour de Force is a brilliantly executed document of a truly memorable concert run, and comes highly recommended").

In a review of the set for Blues Matters!, Pete Sargeant praised the performances of various members of Bonamassa's backing bands at the shows, noting that "The players are fantastic throughout the shows, especially the drummers and percussionists", although concluded by praising the frontman's vocal performances as the main highlight. Total Guitar magazine awarded the video albums four out of five stars, with reviewer Chris Vinnicombe praising the set for "showcasing an artist right at the top of his game in terms of both musical ability and business savvy". Premier Guitar magazine writer Corbin Reiff outlined that "Overall it's a triumph. You really have to marvel at Bonamassa's gumption, and moreso, his sheer will and determination to pull it off." AllMusic's Steve Leggett reviewed the Royal Albert Hall release of the set positively, explaining that "Bonamassa has soul, plenty of it, and he plays guitar with a reverent grace ... the guitarist and singer [is] in fine form in both settings".

Track listings

The Borderline

Bonus features on the video release:
"No Man's Land: An Exclusive Look Behind the Scenes – Part One"
"The Making of Tour de Force – Part One"
"All Access Pass: The Borderline – Live in London Photo Collection"

Shepherd's Bush Empire

Bonus features on the video release:
"No Man's Land: An Exclusive Look Behind the Scenes – Part Two"
"The Making of Tour de Force – Part Two"
"All Access Pass: Shepherd's Bush Empire – Live in London Photo Collection"

Hammersmith Apollo

Bonus features on the video release:
"No Man's Land: An Exclusive Look Behind the Scenes – Part Three"
"The Making of Tour de Force – Part Three"
"All Access Pass: Hammersmith Apollo – Live in London Photo Collection"

Royal Albert Hall

Bonus features on the video release:
"No Man's Land: An Exclusive Look Behind the Scenes – Part Four"
"The Making of Tour de Force – Part Four"
"All Access Pass: Royal Albert Hall – Live in London Photo Collection"

Personnel

Chart positions

Video charts
The Borderline

Shepherd's Bush Empire

Hammersmith Apollo

Royal Albert Hall

Live in London

Album charts
The Borderline

Shepherd's Bush Empire

Hammersmith Apollo

Royal Albert Hall

References

External links

Video albums

Live albums

2013 video albums
2014 live albums
Joe Bonamassa albums
Albums produced by Kevin Shirley
Albums recorded at the Hammersmith Apollo
Live albums recorded at the Royal Albert Hall